Molly Zuckerman-Hartung (born 1975) is an American painter from Olympia, Washington. Since 2015 she has been faculty in Painting and Printmaking at the Yale School of Art.

Early life and education
Zuckerman-Hartung was born in Los Gatos, California in 1975. She earned a BA from Evergreen State College in 1998 and a MFA from the Art Institute of Chicago in 2007.

Painting career
Zuckerman-Hartung lives and works in Connecticut, and is represented by Corbett vs. Dempsey in Chicago, IL and Rachel Uffner Gallery in New York, New York. As of 2015 she has been a critic in Painting/Printmaking at the Yale School of Art.

Zuckerman-Hartung's work is in the collections of the Walker Art Center, the Museum of Contemporary Art in Chicago, and the Booth School of Business at the University of Chicago.

In 2007 she co-founded an artist run gallery space in Chicago called Julius Caesar. Zuckerman-Hartung's first show in the space was called Screwing or Sticking in July 2008.

Her work has been featured in the 2014 Whitney Biennial and in exhibitions at the Walker Art Center, ReMap4, MOCA Cleveland, Corbett vs. Dempsey, Rachel Uffner Gallery, Diana Lowenstein, and Lyles and King.

In 2021, the Blaffer Art Museum in Houston opened a major survey exhibition of her work titled Comic Relief.

Acknowledgements and awards 
Zuckerman-Hartung received the Louis Comfort Tiffany Grant. She was also named an Artist-in-Residence at Cannonball in Miami, Florida. As well as receiving a full scholarship to Ox-Bow.

Outside of her art Zuckerman-Hartung was one of the original organizers of Ladyfest, Ladyfest is a not-for-profit music and art festival that embraces the work of women in the fine arts. Since the original Ladyfest in 2000 it has spread to a global scale, with events held in countries around the world.

Style
Zuckerman-Hartung's style is characterized by experimentation and attention to materials and casualist techniques. In a review of "Queen", a show with Dana DeGiulio at Manhattan's Lyles and King gallery, the New York Times called Zuckerman-Hartung's work "a firestorm of techniques and effects: bleaching, dyeing, staining and sewing linen, silk and humble dropcloths". Hyperallergic remarked that "her abstract paintings often extend above the surface and outside the frame" and reflect "a deep engagement with process, material, and with painting’s long history."

References

External links
Molly Zuckerman-Hartung at Corbett vs. Dempsey

American women painters
Painters from Illinois
Living people
1975 births
Artists from Chicago
People from Los Gatos, California
Painters from California
21st-century American painters
21st-century American women artists
School of the Art Institute of Chicago alumni
Casualist artists